Hilary Davidson may refer to:
 Hilary Davidson (historian), Australian historian of clothing and textiles
 Hilary Davidson (writer), Canadian-American travel and fiction writer